Methylovirgula ligni is a Gram-negative, aerobic, non-motile bacteria from the genus of Methylovirgula which was isolated from the fungus Hypholoma fasciculare in Veluwe in the Netherlands.

References

External links
Type strain of Methylovirgula ligni at BacDive -  the Bacterial Diversity Metadatabase

Beijerinckiaceae
Bacteria described in 2009